This is a list of settlements in West Sussex by population based on the results of the 2011 census. The next United Kingdom census took place in 2021. In 2011, there were 20 built-up area subdivisions with 5,000 or more inhabitants in West Sussex, shown in the table below.

Population ranking

See also 

 West Sussex

References

External links
 Link to ONS built up area statistics

West Sussex settlements by population
West Sussex
West Sussex-related lists
West Sussex